The Penegal is a mountain of the Nonsberg group near Kaltern, South Tyrol, Italy.

References 
 Alpenverein South Tyrol

External links 

Mountains of the Alps
Mountains of South Tyrol
Nonsberg Group